Network media refers to the communication channels used to interconnect nodes on a computer network. Typical examples of network media include copper coaxial cable, copper twisted pair cables and optical fiber cables used in wired networks, and radio waves used in wireless data communications networks.

See also
Networking cables
Structured cabling

Further reading

Communication_circuits